Count of Torre Arias is a hereditary title in the Peerage of Spain, accompanied by the dignity of Grandee and granted in 1761 by Charles III to María Francisca Colón de Larreátegui, in memory of her father, Pedro Colón de Larreátegui, knight of the Order of Alcántara.

Counts of Torre Arias (1761)

María Francisca Colón de Larreátegui y Ximénez de Embún, 1st Countess of Torre Arias
Cayetano Pedro Golfín de Carvajal y Colón de Larreátegui, 2nd Count of Torre Arias
?
Petra Golfín de Carvajal y de las Casas, 4th Countess of Torre Arias
María de la Concepción de Gordón y Golfín de Carvajal, 5th Countess of Torre Arias
Ildefonso Pérez de Guzmán y Gordón, 6th Count of Torre Arias
Alfonso Pérez de Guzmán y Salabert, 7th Count of Torre Arias
Tatiana Pérez de Guzmán y Seebacher, 8th Countess of Torre Arias
José Luis Mesía y Figueroa, 9th Count of Torre Arias

See also
List of current Grandees of Spain

References 

Counts of Spain
Grandees of Spain
Lists of counts
Lists of Spanish nobility